Luwalhati Ricasa-Antonino (born October 22, 1943) born in Upi, North Cotabato, and raised in Kiamba, Saranggani Province, is the former Chairperson of the Mindanao Development Authority (MinDA), the highest public post in Mindanao. She was part of President Benigno S. Aquino III's Cabinet, holding the rank of a national Secretary.

Political career
Antonino served as the Representative of the 1st District of South Cotabato for three terms (9th to 11th Congress) from 1992-2001 .Within these years, she also served as the President of the Mindanao Lawmakers Association (MLA), a 50-member Mindanao bloc in Congress.

While in Congress, Luwalhati Antonino held the Chairmanship for the Foreign Affairs Committee, and the vice-chairmanship of the Appropriations Committee.

MinDA Chairperson

Antonino was appointed MinDA Chair by the President in September 2010, replacing Jesus Dureza. She was the first woman to ever take the helm of the government's principal planning and coordinating agency in Mindanao.

She also performed a broad range of responsibility, including taking decisive roles in addressing critical issues involving Mindanao especially those that require at the least, national representation and at best, Presidential intervention.

Personal life

Antonino is married to former Representative and former mayor of General Santos, Adelbert Antonino.

She is also the mother of former Representative and former City Mayor of General Santos,  Darlene Antonino-Custodio and restaurateur Eliza Bettina R. Antonino. Antonino was born in Upi, North Cotabato, and raised in Kiamba, Sarangani Province.

Antonino earned her degree in B.S. Chemical Engineering at the University of Santo Tomas and a Masters in Business Administration (MBA) in Economics at New York University. After obtaining her masters, she was hired as an economic and statistical analyst at the United Nations Conference on Trade and Development in New York.

References

1943 births
Members of the House of Representatives of the Philippines from South Cotabato
Nationalist People's Coalition politicians
University of Santo Tomas alumni
Living people
People from South Cotabato
Heads of government agencies of the Philippines
Benigno Aquino III administration personnel
Duterte administration personnel